Susan Hilferty is an American costume designer for theatre, opera, and film.

Biography

Early life and education
Hilferty grew up in a big family in Arlington, Massachusetts, where her greatest source of joy was the library. "We didn’t have a television," she says. "Reading was my entertainment."  says Hilferty, whose interest in art and designing clothing led to her making all of her own clothes by the age of 12.

As an undergraduate at Syracuse University, Hilferty majored in painting with a minor in fashion design. She also fulfilled her work-study responsibilities in the school's theatre. She credits her Junior year, studying abroad in London as the experience that led her to designing for the theatre. "I had been in plays as a child, but I’d never actually seen a production onstage. It turned me on to theatre design because I immediately understood how the visuals are an integral part of storytelling. I see myself as a storyteller who happens to use clothes as my medium."

After graduating from Syracuse, Hilferty headed to New York City, where she worked as a freelance costume designer as well as in a costume shop and as a draper for a few years before earning a Master of Fine Arts degree in theater design from the Yale School of Drama.

Career

Susan Hilferty has designed costumes for more than 300 productions all around the world.  She is perhaps best known for her work on the musical Wicked, currently represented on Broadway and in cities across the globe. For her work on Wicked, Hilferty was awarded the 2004 Tony Award for Best Costume Design, Drama Desk Award for Outstanding Costume Design and Outer Critics Circle Award. Other Broadway credits include Spring Awakening, Into the Woods (2002 Revival), Lestat and Assassins.

Her many collaborations include productions with such well-known directors as Joe Mantello, James Lapine, Michael Mayer, Walter Bobbie, Robert Falls, Tony Kushner, Robert Woodruff, JoAnne Akalaitis, the late Garland Wright, James MacDonald, Bartlett Sher, Mark Lamos, Frank Galati, Des McAnuff, Christopher Ashley, Emily Mann, David Jones, Marion McClinton, Neil Pepe, Rebecca Taichman, Gregory Boyd, Laurie Anderson, Doug Wright, Carole Rothman, Oskar Eustis, Garry Hynes, Richard Nelson and Athol Fugard (the South African writer with whom she works as set and costume designer and often as co-director since 1980).

Her work in regional theatre in the United States includes productions with A.C.T San Francisco, ACT Seattle, The Acting Company, Alley Theatre, Alliance Theatre, Baltimore Center Stage, Berkeley Repertory Theatre, Berkshire Theatre Festival, Center Theare Group, Court Theatre (Chicago), Geffen Playhouse, Goodman Theatre, Guthrie Theater, Hartford Stage, Huntington Theatre Company, Kennedy Center, La Jolla Playhouse, Long Wharf Theatre, McCarter Theatre, New York Stage and Film, Old Globe Theatre, Pasadena Playhouse, Seattle Repertory Theatre, Signature Theatre (Arlington, Virginia), Trinity Rep, Williamstown Theatre Festival, and the Yale Repertory Theatre.

In addition to her career as a costume designer, Hilferty has designed sets as well as directed. She currently acts as Chair of the Design for Stage and Film department of New York University's Tisch School of the Arts in New York City. When asked what qualities she considers important in potential students, Hilferty replied, "I look for curiosity. I find that unless someone is ready, willing, and able to open themselves up to any number of cultures and stories, they can’t be a designer. Our role as designers is to create a culture. In any given year, I could be working on a play set in South Africa in the 1970s, a musical based on a very small specific Texas town, and a Musical based on a Hans Christian Andersen fairytale. The list goes on, and as designers, we have to constantly be thrilled to ask, ‘What was it like in New York City in 1974? What was it like in India in 1642? What will it be like on the Earth in 2050?’"

She currently lives in New York City.

Productions

Broadway
A Lesson From Aloes - 1980
Blood Knot - 1985
Coastal Disturbances - 1987
The Comedy of Errors - 1987
How to Succeed in Business Without Really Trying - 1995
The Night of the Iguana - 1996
Sex and Longing" - 1996
"dirty BLONDE" - 2000Into the Woods - 2002 *Nominee Tony Award for Best Costume Design, Nominee Drama Desk Award for Outstanding Costume DesignWicked - 2003 *Winner Tony Award for Best Costume Design, Winner Drama Desk Award for Outstanding Costume DesignAssassins - 2004The Good Body - 2004Lestat - 2006 *Nominee Tony Award for Best Costume DesignSpring Awakening - 2006 *Nominee Tony Award for Best Costume DesignRadio Golf - 2007Sondheim on Sondheim - 2010Wonderland - 2011The Road to Mecca - 2012Lewis Black: Running on Empty - 2012Annie - 2012Hands on a Hardbody - 2013Black to the Future - Visual Consultant - 2016Present Laughter'' - 2017 *Nominee Tony Award for Best Costume Design

Off Broadway

References

External links
 
 

Living people
American costume designers
Women costume designers
Drama Desk Award winners
Helpmann Award winners
Tony Award winners
New York University faculty
1953 births
People from Arlington, Massachusetts
Syracuse University alumni
Yale School of Drama alumni